Kladruby is a municipality and village in Benešov District in the Central Bohemian Region of the Czech Republic. It has about 300 inhabitants.

Economy
Kladruby is known for its large rehabilitation institute. It was founded here in the 1930s.

References

Villages in Benešov District